Agenor Figueiredo Santos (7 August 1981 - October 2019), commonly known as Agenor, was professional football defensive midfielder who plays for Brazilian side Santo André. 
He died in October 2019 as victim of a traffic accident.

Career
Agenor has played for Brasiliense Futebol Clube in the Copa do Brasil.

Contract
 Brasiliense.

References

External links

1981 births
2019 deaths
Brasiliense Futebol Clube players
Paraná Clube players
Atlético Clube Goianiense players
Associação Atlética Ponte Preta players
América Futebol Clube (MG) players
Association football midfielders
Road incident deaths in Brazil
Footballers from Rio de Janeiro (city)
Brazilian footballers